Gnaly Albert Maxwel Cornet (born 27 September 1996) is an Ivorian professional footballer who plays as a winger and full-back for Premier League club West Ham United and the Ivory Coast national team. He has previously played in France for Metz II, Metz, Lyon II and Lyon and in England with Burnley.

Club career

Metz
Cornet is a youth exponent from Metz. Aged 15 years and 11 months he made his debut for Metz in the third-tier of French football, the Championnat National in a game on 31 August 2012. Cornet was an 85th minute substitute for Alhassane Keita in Metz’ 6-3 win against Quevilly. He made his Ligue 2 debut on 2 August 2013 against Laval. He replaced Yeni Ngbakoto after 79 minutes in a 1–0 home victory.

Lyon
On 16 January 2015, Cornet signed for Ligue 1 club Lyon. He made his league debut for the club against his former club Metz on 25 January 2015, replacing Alexandre Lacazette after 34 minutes due to an injury, in an eventual 2–0 home win. Cornet scored his first goal for Lyon on 23 October 2015 as an 89th-minute substitute in a 3–0 home win over Toulouse.

In January 2020, Cornet was tested at the left-back position by Lyon's coach Rudi Garcia following the injuries of Youssouf Koné and Fernando Marçal. After his good performances, he became the club's starting left-back for the rest of the season. On 15 August 2020, Cornet scored a goal against Manchester City in the 2019–20 UEFA Champions League quarter-finals which Lyon won 3–1 and progressed to the semi-finals.

Burnley
On 29 August 2021, Cornet signed for Premier League club Burnley for a €15 million fee on a five-year deal. On 18 September, he made his Burnley debut as a substitute, replacing Jóhann Berg Guðmundsson in a 1–0 defeat against Arsenal. Cornet scored his first goal for the club in a 2–2 draw against Leicester City on 25 September. Although the season culminated in relegation for Burnley, Cornet finished the season as the team’s top scorer with nine goals in 26 appearances.

West Ham United
On 5 August 2022, Cornet joined West Ham United, signing a five-year contract with a further one-year option, for an undisclosed fee from Burnley.

International career
Cornet was born in Ivory Coast, and emigrated with his family to northern France at the age of three. He was a youth international for France at every level but declared for the Ivory Coast national team on 5 April 2017. He made his senior debut for Ivory Coast in a 5–0 friendly loss to the Netherlands on 4 June 2017.

Personal life 
Cornet has three children. Growing up, he idolised Didier Drogba due to his Ivorian birth and subsequent move to France. Outside of football, he enjoys playing tennis.

Career statistics

Club

International

Scores and results list Ivory Coast's goal tally first

Honours 
Lyon

 Coupe de la Ligue runner-up: 2019–20

References

External links

 Maxwel Cornet at West Ham United F.C.
 
 
 
 
 
 
 

1996 births
Living people
French sportspeople of Ivorian descent
Ivorian emigrants to France
Ivorian footballers
French footballers
Association football forwards
Ivory Coast international footballers
France youth international footballers
France under-21 international footballers
2019 Africa Cup of Nations players
2021 Africa Cup of Nations players
Championnat National players
Ligue 2 players
Ligue 1 players
Premier League players
FC Metz players
Olympique Lyonnais players
Burnley F.C. players
West Ham United F.C. players
Ivorian expatriate footballers
Ivorian expatriate sportspeople in England
Expatriate footballers in England